The canton of Le Pont-de-Beauvoisin is an administrative division of the Savoie department, southeastern France. Its borders were modified at the French canton reorganisation which came into effect in March 2015. Its seat is in Le Pont-de-Beauvoisin.

It consists of the following communes:

Aiguebelette-le-Lac
Attignat-Oncin
Ayn
La Bauche
Belmont-Tramonet
La Bridoire
Corbel
Domessin
Dullin
Les Échelles
Entremont-le-Vieux
Lépin-le-Lac
Montagnole
Nances 
Le Pont-de-Beauvoisin
Saint-Alban-de-Montbel
Saint-Béron
Saint-Cassin
Saint-Christophe
Saint-Franc
Saint-Jean-de-Couz
Saint-Pierre-d'Entremont
Saint-Pierre-de-Genebroz
Saint-Sulpice
Saint-Thibaud-de-Couz
Verel-de-Montbel
Vimines

References

Cantons of Savoie